James Hopwood may refer to:
 James Hopwood the Elder (1740s or 50s–1819), British engraver
 James Hopwood the Younger (c. 1800–c. 1850), British engraver
 James Avery Hopwood (1882–1928), American playwright

See also
 James Hopwood Jeans (1877–1946), English physicist, astronomer and mathematician